This is a list of libraries in Ponce, Puerto Rico. Both, public and private libraries are listed. Also listed, for their environment conductive to study and research, are non-circulating, archive organizations.

Library list summary table
Note: The table that follows lists libraries by their year of founding, that is, their year of opening. A listing sorted by any of the other fields can be obtained by clicking on the header of the field. For example, clicking on "Barrio" will sort libraries by their barrio location.

Key:
C. = Calle (street)
NB = Northbound
SB = Southbound
WB = Westbound
EB = Eastbound
Unk = Unknown
N/A = Not applicable

References

Puerto Rican culture
libraries
Libraries, Ponce
Lists of libraries